Henry Oldman Munn (1835 – 18 July 1864) was an English first-class cricketer and British Army officer.

The son of William Munn, he was born in 1835 at Bobbing, Kent. He was educated at Eton College, before being commissioned in the East Kent Militia as a lieutenant in December 1853. However in August 1854, he had joined the 13th Light Dragoons as a cornet by purchase. He was promoted to lieutenant without purchase in July 1855, later being promoted to captain in October 1862. In the same year as his promotion to captain, Munn made a single appearance in first-class cricket for the Gentlemen of Kent against the Gentlemen of Marylebone Cricket Club at Canterbury. Batting twice in the match, he was run out in the Gentlemen of Kent first innings for 23 runs, while in their second innings he was dismissed without scoring by E. M. Grace. 

He was married to Isabella Frances Toke in 1861, with Munn dying at Canterbury in July 1864.

References

External links

1835 births
1864 deaths
People from Bobbing, Kent
People educated at Eton College
13th Hussars officers
English cricketers
Gentlemen of Kent cricketers